is a town located in Kume District, Okayama Prefecture, Japan., the town had an estimated population of 4,483 in 2192 households and a population density of 57 persons per km². Kumenan  is known as the birthplace of Honen, the founder of the Jodo sect of Buddhism.

Geography
Kumenan is located on the Kibi Plateau, in the east-central part of Okayama Prefecture. There are few flatlands, and most of the town is mountain, forests and plateaus.

Neighboring  municipalities 
Okayama Prefecture
Okayama
Akaiwa
Misaki

Climate
Kumenan has a Humid subtropical climate (Köppen Cfa) characterized by warm summers and cool winters with moderate snowfall.  The average annual temperature in Kumenan is 13.5 °C. The average annual rainfall is 1501 mm with September as the wettest month. The temperatures are highest on average in January, at around 25.5 °C, and lowest in January, at around 1.9 °C.

Demography
Per Japanese census data, the population of Kumenan has been as follows.  The population has been decreasing since the 1950s.

History 
The area of Kumenan was part of ancient Mimasaka Province.  The village of Yuge was established with the creation of the modern municipalities system on June 1, 1889. It was raised to town status on April 1, 1917. Yuge annexed ten neighboring village of Takigawa on April 1, 1940. On April 1, 1954, Yuge merged with the villages of Kōme, Tatsuyama, and Tanjōji to form the town of Kumenan.

Government
Yuge has a mayor-council form of government with a directly elected mayor and a unicameral town council of eight members. Kumenan, collectively with the town of Misaki, contributes one member to the Okayama Prefectural Assembly. In terms of national politics, the town is part of the Okayama 3rd district of the lower house of the Diet of Japan.

Economy
The main industry in the area is agriculture. The main crops are rice, fruit trees such as pears and grapes, leaf tobacco, and poultry farming.

Education
Kumenan has three public elementary school and one public junior high school operated by the town government. The town does not have a high school. Okayama Prefecture operates one special education school for the handicapped.

Transportation

Railway 
 JR West (JR West) - Tsuyama Line
  -  -

Highways

Local attractions
 Tanjō-ji, Buddhist temple

Noted people from Kumenan
Sen Katayama, early Japanese Marxist political activist and journalist, co-founder of the Japanese Communist Party.

References

External links

Town of Kumenan 

Towns in Okayama Prefecture
 Kumenan, Okayama